is  the assistant coach of the Passlab Yamagata Wyverns.

Head coaching record

|- 
| style="text-align:left;"|Mitsubishi Electric
| style="text-align:left;"|2002-03
| 21||9||12|||| style="text-align:center;"|5th|||-||-||-||
| style="text-align:center;"|-
|- 
| style="text-align:left;"|Mitsubishi Electric
| style="text-align:left;"|2003-04
| 28||16||12|||| style="text-align:center;"|3rd|||3||2||1||
| style="text-align:center;"|3rd
|- 
| style="text-align:left;"|Mitsubishi Electric
| style="text-align:left;"|2004-05
| 28||16||12|||| style="text-align:center;"|3rd|||3||2||1||
| style="text-align:center;"|3rd
|- 
| style="text-align:left;"|Toyama Grouses
| style="text-align:left;"|2006-07
| 40||13||27|||| style="text-align:center;"|7th|||-||-||-||
| style="text-align:center;"|-
|- 
| style="text-align:left;"|Toyama Grouses
| style="text-align:left;"|2007-08
| 44||7||37|||| style="text-align:center;"|5th in Eastern|||-||-||-||
| style="text-align:center;"|-
|- 
| style="text-align:left;"|Toyama Grouses
| style="text-align:left;"|2008
| 10||3||7|||| style="text-align:center;"|Fired|||-||-||-||
| style="text-align:center;"|-
|- 
| style="text-align:left;"|Saitama Broncos
| style="text-align:left;"|2009-10
| 52||17||35|||| style="text-align:center;"|5th in Eastern|||-||-||-||
| style="text-align:center;"|-
|-

References

1970 births
Living people

Japanese basketball coaches
Nagoya Diamond Dolphins coaches
Nagoya Diamond Dolphins players
Saitama Broncos coaches

Toyama Grouses coaches